William Booth (born October 1880) was an English footballer. His regular position was as a forward. Born in Stockport, he played for Manchester United and Edge Lane.

Transferring from Edge Lane in December 1900, Booth  made two appearances as a forward for Manchester United, on 26 and 29 December 1900, aged 20. The 26 December match against Blackpool resulted in a 4–0 win for United, while the 29 December match against Glossop North End resulted in a 3–0 win for United.

Booth transferred from Manchester United in June 1901.

References

External links
MUFCInfo.com profile

1880 births
English footballers
Manchester United F.C. players
Year of death missing
Middlesex Regiment soldiers
Footballers from Stockport
Association football forwards